Jong Jin-sim (born 1 February 1992) is a North Korean volleyball player who competed in the 2010 Asian Games. At club level, she competed with April 25 Sports Club. She was named MVP at the 2015 VTV International Women's Volleyball Cup.

External links
Athlete Information - JONG Jin Sim at 2013 Summer Universiade

References

1992 births
Living people
North Korean women's volleyball players
Volleyball players at the 2010 Asian Games
Asian Games competitors for North Korea
21st-century North Korean women